Saleh Kamrani (born 1972) is an Iranian-Swedish lawyer, human rights defender, and politician of Azerbaijani origin. He is regarded as prisoner of conscience by Amnesty International. Kamrani defended Iranian activists like Mohsen Sazegara, Yousef Azizi Bani-Torof and many others. He was repeatedly threatened for his activities and persecuted by Iranian security services and was abducted in 2006. He was sentenced to one year in prison, and after serving his sentence, he was forced to flee Iran, and move to Sweden, where he founded the Azerbaijan Central Party and AnT TV.

Early life 
Saleh Kamrani was born on 31 December 1972, in the city of Ahar, East Azerbaijan of Iran, in an Iranian Azerbaijani family. After graduating from high school, he entered the law faculty of Shiraz University. While studying there, Kamrani began to conduct Azerbaijani language and literature courses in the university's dormitory. Kamrani also received a master's degree from Shiraz University.

Career and activism 
Kamrani began his career after completing his military service. He participated in the establishment of the Shiraz University Turkic Language Students Association and the editor-in-chief of the Azerbaijani and Persian-language newspaper Savalan. Kamrani later represented a number of Iranian Azerbaijani activists who were detained in connection with their political or cultural activities, including Gholam Reza Amani, Abbas Lisani, Hamid Iman, Seyyed Javad Mousavi, Hidayat Zakir, Maharam Kamrani, Ibrahim Savalan, Saleh Molla Abbasi, Javad Abbas, and Abbas Nik Ravan, defending them in the court as their lawyers. He also worked for non-Azerbaijani activists like Mohsen Sazegara, and also defended the Ahwazi Arabs activists, including Yousef Azizi Bani-Torof.

Kamrani was repeatedly threatened for his activities and persecuted by Iranian security services. He went to Urmia in 2005 with his brother, Maharam Kamrani, the founder of the Azerbaijani-language student newspapers Bakhish and Oyanish, to defend another activist in court. In the middle of the night, the Iranian security services raided his house, detaining him and his brother. Although they were released a few days later, his brother was later detained again. After the violent suppression of Iranian Azerbaijani protesters over the cockroach controversy in 2006 and the deaths of dozens of protesters, Kamrani formed a group called the Committee to Protect National Rights and began giving interviews to various international television and radio stations. He was then abducted by the Iranian security services on 14 June 2006, on his way home from Tehran. Although his whereabouts were unknown for several days, it was later revealed that he was being held in Evin Prison. This was confirmed on 19 June by his wife, Mina Asgari. Although he was released in 2007, he was again detained on 18 August of that year and sentenced to one year in prison. After his release, he was forced to flee the country again because of persecution and threats. He left the country in 2010 and moved to Sweden. There, he began giving interviews to a number of international channels as an independent expert, and founded the Azerbaijan Central Party and AnT TV.

References 

1972 births
Living people
Shiraz University alumni
Amnesty International prisoners of conscience held by Iran
20th-century Iranian lawyers
Iranian human rights activists
Iranian emigrants to Sweden
Iranian newspaper publishers (people)
Iranian prisoners and detainees
People from Ahar
Inmates of Evin Prison
Enforced disappearances in Iran
21st-century Iranian lawyers